Farmakon was a Finnish progressive death metal band formed in 2001. The band was made up of Toni Salminen (guitarist/vocalist), Marko Eskola (vocalist) and Pekka Kauppila (bass guitarist). The band released two studio albums. The band used both clean and growling vocals and incorporated jazz and funk elements into their music.

Farmakon's first album, A Warm Glimpse, was released in 2003, and the opening track, "Loosely of Ameobas" was included on Earache's "Metal: A Headbanger's Companion II" compilation.

Robin, the band's second album, was released on  February 21, 2007, and in America on April 29, 2008. The album was awarded 10th place in the Metal Storm ranking of the top death metal albums of 2007.

In 2007, Farmakon started to work on material for a new album, tentatively entitled Syan. The band announced that the former drummer Riku Airisto had agreed to play the drums on the album, after the departure of Matti Auerkallio.

In September 2010, the band announced on their message board that it had split up. Syan was never released.

Band members
Source: Farmakon website
 Marko Eskola − vocals 
 Toni Salminen − guitar, vocals
 Pekka Kauppila − bass guitar

Former band members
 Matti Auerkallio - drums (2004–2007)
 Lassi Paunonen - guitars (2001–2007)
 Riku Airisto - drums (2001–2003)

Discography 
 A Warm Glimpse (2003)
 Robin (2007)

References

External links 
 Official website  dead link
 Farmakon on Myspace

Finnish heavy metal musical groups
Musical groups established in 2001
Earache Records artists
Finnish musical trios